Richard Kevin Plumb (born 24 September 1946) is a former professional association footballer, who played as a forward in The Football League for three different teams.

Plumb started out as an apprentice with his home town team, Swindon Town, but although he spent 16 months as a professional with them he never made it into the first team. His League debut came after moving to Bristol Rovers in April 1965, when he played against Brighton & Hove Albion in October of that year. He went on to make 39 League appearances for The Pirates, scoring eight goals, before non-League side Yeovil Town broke their transfer record to sign him for £3,000 in October 1968.

His first of two spells with the Somerset club saw him score 53 goals in 111 appearances in all competitions, and when Charlton Athletic came in to sign him in September 1970 he also became Yeovil's record sale, at £7,000. He made 43 League appearances and scored ten goals for Charlton, before moving on to Exeter City in 1972, where he played a further 59 times in The Football League and scored 17 goals. In 1974, he returned to Yeovil Town, and in this spell he played a grand total of 226 games and scored 97 goals. His combined total of 150 goals for The Glovers made him their second highest scoring post-war player, as of March 2010. He ended his footballing career with Chard Town, who he joined in the summer of 1978.

References

1946 births
Living people
Sportspeople from Swindon
English footballers
English Football League players
Association football forwards
Bristol Rovers F.C. players
Yeovil Town F.C. players
Charlton Athletic F.C. players
Exeter City F.C. players
Chard Town F.C. players
Swindon Town F.C. players